Club Atlético La Paz is a Mexican professional football team based in La Paz, Baja California Sur that plays in Liga de Expansión MX.

History
On April 20, 2022, Grupo Orlegi announced the end of the TM Fútbol Club franchise. The next day the purchase of the franchise by the GLS Promotoría del Deporte company was announced. This company also owns the club Mazorqueros F.C.

After its creation, the board announced that the base of the team will be made up of players from Mazorqueros, Tampico Madero and some other players from Liga MX. In addition, the coaching staff will be made up of the one who already managed Mazorqueros F.C. during the 2021–22 season.

On June 1, 2022 the team was accepted as a member of the Liga de Expansión MX.

The team made its official debut on June 30, 2022 against Atlante F.C. at Mexico City, Atlético La Paz lost the match 3–0. The team scored their first official goal on July 13 when José Daniel Hernández scored against Leones Negros UdeG, later Atlético La Paz achieved their first win on August 23 when they defeated Raya2 Expansión by a score of 1–0.

Stadium
Atlético La Paz plays its matches at Estadio Guaycura which has a capacity for 5,209 spectators and was remodeled in 2019.

Personnel

Coaching staff

Players

First-team squad

Reserve teams
Mazorqueros F.C.
Reserve team that plays in the Liga Premier, the third level of the Mexican league system.

References

La Paz, Baja California Sur
Football clubs in Baja California Sur
Association football clubs established in 2022
2022 establishments in Mexico